There are several rivers named Vermelho River in Brazil:

 Vermelho River (Corrente River tributary), in the Goiás state in central Brazil
 Vermelho River (Araguaia River tributary), in the Goiás state in central Brazil
 Vermelho River (Mato Grosso), in the Mato Grosso state in western Brazil
 Vermelho River (Pará), in the Pará state in north-central Brazil
 Vermelho River (Iguazu River tributary), in the Paraná state in southern Brazil
 Vermelho River (Paranapanema River tributary), in the Paraná state in southern Brazil
 Vermelho River (Rondônia), a river of Rondônia
 Vermelho River (Santa Catarina), in the Santa Catarina state in southeastern Brazil, draining to the Uruguay River
 Vermelho River (São Paulo), in the São Paulo state in southeastern Brazil
 Vermelho River (Manuel Alves Grande River tributary), in the Tocantins state in central Brazil
 Vermelho River (Perdida River tributary), in the Tocantins state in central Brazil

See also
 Uruçuí-Vermelho River, in Piauí state, Brazil
 Rio Vermelho, a Brazilian municipality in Minas Gerais
 Rio Vermelho State Forest, Rondônia, Brazil
 Vermelho (disambiguation)